Cecilia Rodriguez Aragon is an American computer scientist, professor, author, and champion aerobatic pilot who is best known as the co-inventor (with Raimund Seidel) of the treap data structure, a type of binary search tree that orders nodes by adding a priority as well as a key to each node. She is also known for her work in data-intensive science and visual analytics of very large data sets, for which she received the prestigious Presidential Early Career Award for Scientists and Engineers (PECASE).

Education
Aragon received her B.S. in mathematics from the California Institute of Technology in 1982, M.S. from the University of California, Berkeley in 1987 and, Ph.D. in computer science from the same institution in 2004. For her doctoral studies, Aragon worked under the direction of Marti Hearst.

Career
She is a professor in the Department of Human Centered Design and Engineering at the University of Washington in Seattle. Her research interests in the field of human-centered data science include eScience, scientific and information visualization, visual analytics, image processing, collaborative creativity, analysis of spontaneous text communication, dynamic affect
detection, and games for good. Prior to her appointment at UW, she was a computer scientist and data scientist at
Lawrence Berkeley National Laboratory for six years and NASA Ames Research Center for nine years, and before that, an airshow and test pilot, entrepreneur, and member of the United States Aerobatic Team.

Presidential Early Career Award 
On July 9, 2009, Aragon received a Presidential Early Career Award for Scientists and Engineers, the highest honor bestowed by the United States government on outstanding scientists and engineers in the early stages of their independent research careers.

She was recognized for "seminal research in workflow management and visual analytics for data-intensive scientific research, including the development of the Fourier contour analysis algorithm and Sunfall."

Aerobatic career
Aragon first won a slot on the United States Aerobatic Team in 1991. She holds the record for shortest time from first solo in an airplane to membership on the US Team (less than six years),  and was also the first Latina to win a slot on the Team.

A team member from 1991 to 1994, she was a bronze medalist at the 1993 U.S. National Aerobatic Championships and the 1994 World Aerobatic Championships. She has also won over 70 trophies in regional aerobatic competitions at the Unlimited level and was California State Unlimited Aerobatic Champion in 1990.  Aragon has also flown airshows (as distinct from aerobatic competitions) professionally since 1990.

Aragon has been a flight instructor since 1987.  In 1989, she founded one of the first aerobatic and tailwheel flight schools in Northern California.

Aragon helped develop an "unusual attitude recovery training", whereby  flight students are taught how to recover from emergency situations in flight. Between 1987 and 2008, she was a flight instructor at Oakland, Livermore, and Tracy Airports, giving over 2400 hours of flight instruction and over 3000 hours of ground instruction.

Autobiography
In September 2020, Aragon's memoir, Flying Free, was published by Blackstone Publishing. Her autobiography was listed in September 2020 Ms. Magazine book list. Her book won the 2021 PNWA Nancy Pearl award.

Bibliography

Selected scientific papers

Non-science non-fiction books

Short stories (fiction)

Newspaper

References

External links
 Official website
 "Daredevils of the Sky." NOVA. PBS. (Aired February 1, 1994; contains footage and interview with Aragon.)
 Treaps info including links to source code and original papers
 
 

Year of birth missing (living people)
Living people
Aerobatic pilots
California Institute of Technology alumni
People from West Lafayette, Indiana
American women computer scientists
University of California, Berkeley alumni
University of Washington faculty
American aviation record holders
American flight instructors
American women flight instructors
American women aviation record holders
21st-century American women scientists
American computer scientists
21st-century American scientists
American women academics